Payton Michael Pritchard (born January 28, 1998) is an American professional basketball player for the Boston Celtics of the National Basketball Association (NBA). He played college basketball for the Oregon Ducks. As a sophomore, he was named second-team all-conference in the Pac-12. As a senior, he was a finalist for the Naismith Trophy.

Pritchard was drafted 26th overall in the 2020 NBA draft by the Celtics. He reached the NBA Finals with the team in 2022.

High school career
Pritchard won four consecutive state titles with West Linn High School and earned 2014 and 2015 Todd Pratt Player of the Year, Oregon Class 6A Player of the Year and 2015 Gatorade Oregon Player of the Year. He averaged 22 points and 5.8 assists per game as a junior (2014–15) and 23.6 points, 6.8 assists, and 3.1 steals as a senior (2015–16). A four-star recruit in the ESPN ranking, he committed to the University of Oregon Ducks in August 2015. He had previously committed to Oklahoma, where his father Terry played football. Pritchard scored 45 points in the Northwest Shootout, an all-star game between players from Oregon and Washington.

Pritchard played multiple future NBA stars and lottery picks at the Les Schwab Invitational throughout his high school career, such as Ben Simmons, Jaylen Brown, and Jahlil Okafor.

College career
In his freshman year (2016–17), Pritchard made 39 appearances for the Ducks, averaging 7.4 points and 3.6 assists per game. In a game against UCLA, Pritchard made a deep three to pull the Ducks within one behind assisting on Dillon Brooks game-winning three over Lonzo Ball. Oregon made its first Final Four appearance since the first NCAA Tournament ever and Pritchard was the only freshman to start in that year's Final Four.

On November 25, 2017, Pritchard scored a career-high 29 points to go with eight assists and six rebounds in an 84–79 win over DePaul. Pritchard was the lone returning starter for the Ducks in his sophomore year (2017–18) and averaged a markedly higher 14.5 points, 4.8 assists, and 3.6 rebounds per game.

As a junior, Pritchard got off to a disappointing start but turned it up late in the season leading Oregon to an improbable Pac 12 Tournament Championship and reaching the Sweet 16 of the NCAA Tournament. He averaged 12.9 points, 4.6 assists, and 3.9 rebounds per game and was named MVP of the Pac-12 Tournament. Following the season he declared for the 2019 NBA draft but decided to return to Oregon for his senior season.

As a senior, Pritchard was one of the best players in collegiate basketball. On January 18, 2020, Pritchard scored 22 points and drained a 30-foot shot with 3 seconds left to complete a 16-point comeback win over Washington in overtime 64–61. On January 30, Pritchard scored 21 points in a 77–72 win against California and became Oregon's all-time assists leader. He scored a career-high 38 points in a 73–72 overtime win against Arizona on February 22 in a must win game to keep Oregon's hopes for a Pac 12 regular season title alive. As a senior, Pritchard averaged 20.5 points, 5.5 assists, and 4.3 rebounds per game, and he was named the Pac-12 Player of the Year. Pritchard was also a consensus All-American selection and was awarded the Bob Cousy Award as the nation's top point guard.

Professional career

Boston Celtics (2020–present)
Pritchard was selected with the 26th pick in the first round of the 2020 NBA draft by the Boston Celtics. On November 24, 2020, Pritchard signed a four-year, $10.5 million rookie contract with the Boston Celtics including team options in the third and fourth year. Pritchard impressed in his professional debut scoring 17 points in a preseason game against the Philadelphia 76ers on December 15, 2020. In the absence of Kemba Walker, he was fourth in playing time through the first five games, behind only Jayson Tatum, Jaylen Brown, and Marcus Smart. On January 4, 2021, Pritchard scored a career-high 23 points in a 126–114 win over the Toronto Raptors with eight assists and two rebounds. In the next game, Pritchard made the game-winning layup in a 107-105 win over the Miami Heat. On January 12, 2021, Pritchard earned the first start of his NBA career but had an underwhelming performance only scoring 2 points in 28 minutes in a loss to the Detroit Pistons. This showing came in the beginning stages of what can be described as his "rookie wall" where he struggled to be as efficient and impactful as he was early in the season. While this may have been a result of Kemba Walker's reintegration into the lineup, it is also a common phenomenon associated with young players , specifically rookie guards, in which the extensive and rigorous workload of their first professional season takes its toll on the mental and physical health of the players. Pritchard alluded to his struggles later on in the season, but seemingly burst through this looming "rookie wall" in mid-April when he scored in double figures in six of seven games in a row including a new career best, 28 points in a game against the Oklahoma City Thunder on April 27, 2021.

Pritchard played for the Celtics in the 2021 NBA Summer League and was named All-Summer League First Team after averaging 17 points and 8 assists.

Pritchard helped the Celtics reach the 2022 NBA Finals where they were defeated in 6 games by the Golden State Warriors.

National team career
Pritchard represented the US at the 2015 FIBA 3x3 Under-18 World Championship where, in his best game, he had 9 three-pointers against Poland. He scored 12 points on 4 three-pointers in 14 minutes as a member of the USA National Select Team at the 2016 Nike Hoop Summit.

Pritchard also made the US squad for the 2017 FIBA U19 World Cup in Egypt. Pritchard averaged 9.0 points, 3.1 assists, and 2.9 rebounds per contest during the tournament, including 16 points against RJ Barrett and Canada. Team USA won the bronze medal, and Pritchard was named to the All-Star Five.

Career statistics

NBA

Regular season

|-
| style="text-align:left;"| 2020–21
| style="text-align:left;"| Boston
| 66 || 28 || 19.2 || .567 || .411 || .889 || 2.4 || 3.5 || .6 || 1 || 7.7
|-
| style="text-align:left;"| 2021–22
| style="text-align:left;"| Boston
| 71 || 2 || 14.1 || .429 || .412 || 1.000 || 3.9 || 2.0 || .4 || .2 || 8.2
|- class="sort bottom"
| style="text-align:center;" colspan="2"| Career
| 137 || 30 || 16.6 || .498 || .412 || .924 || 3.2 || 2.8 || .5 || .1 || 7.9

Playoffs

|-
| style="text-align:left;"| 2021
| style="text-align:left;"| Boston
| 5 || 0 || 13.4 || .353 || .300 || 1.000 || 1.8 || 2.4 || .4 || .1 || 3.4
|-
| style="text-align:left;"| 2022
| style="text-align:left;"| Boston
| 24 || 0 || 12.9 || .422 || .124 || .667 || 3.2 || 1.6 || .3 || .1 || 7.8
|- class="sort bottom"
| style="text-align:center;" colspan="2"| Career
| 29 || 0 || 13.0 || .412 || .329 || .750 || 1.9 || 2.8 || .3 || .1 || 4.5

College

|-
| style="text-align:left;"| 2016–17
| style="text-align:left;"| Oregon
| 39 || 35 || 28.3 || .393 || .350 || .730 || 3.4 || 3.6 || 1.2 || .1 || 7.4
|-
| style="text-align:left;"| 2017–18
| style="text-align:left;"| Oregon
| 36 || 36 || 35.1 || .447 || .413 || .774 || 3.8 || 4.8 || 1.4 || .0 || 14.5
|-
| style="text-align:left;"| 2018–19
| style="text-align:left;"| Oregon
| 38 || 38 || 35.5 || .418 || .328 || .838 || 3.9 || 4.6 || 1.8 || .1 || 12.9
|-
| style="text-align:left;"| 2019–20
| style="text-align:left;"| Oregon
| 31 || 31 || 36.6 || .468 || .415 || .821 || 4.3 || 5.5 || 1.5 || .0 || 20.5
|- class="sort bottom"
| style="text-align:center;" colspan="2"| Career
| 144 || 140 || 33.7 || .437 || .379 || .800 || 3.8 || 4.6 || 1.5 || .0 || 13.5

References

External links
Oregon Ducks bio
USA Basketball bio

1998 births
Living people
All-American college men's basketball players
American men's basketball players
Basketball players from Oregon
Boston Celtics draft picks
Boston Celtics players
Oregon Ducks men's basketball players
People from Tualatin, Oregon
People from West Linn, Oregon
Point guards
Sportspeople from the Portland metropolitan area